The Sind–Sagar Railway was originally constructed as a Metre Gauge railway line from Lala Musa to Malakwal. In 1886 the Sind–Sagar Railway was amalgamated with other railways to form the North Western State Railway and railway line from was converted to broad gauge. The Chak Nizam Bridge, also known as Victoria Bridge, was completed in early 1887 over the Jhelum river in Shahpur District and connected Jhelum to Lahore. The NWR Sind-Sagar Branch Line was the new name for the line and continued to be extended with branch lines and designated as part of the 'Frontier Section - Military Line'.

Sections

Lala Musa–Malakwal Railway
 Lala Musa Junction–Malakwal Junction (today part of the Shorkot–Lalamusa Branch Line)

Malakwal–Khushab Railway

 Malakwal Junction–Khushab Junction

Dandot Light Railway

Gharibwal Cement Works Railway
The Gharibwal Cement Works Railway opened in May 1886 as a   railway from Haranpur Junction to Gharibwal. It was built to serve the Gharibwal quarry.

Malakwal–Bhera Railway
 Malakwal Junction–Bhera via Miani, Hazurpur

Personnel
No staff records are available at the British Library IOR. The following personnel have been identified from various sources as being posted to this railway:

James Ramsay, Executive Engineer from the Public Works Department(PWD) was Engineer-in-Chief of the Sind–Sagar Railwayin early 1880s. He was also Engineer-in-Chief of the Chak-Nizam Bridge that was completed in 1887.
Frederick Robert Upcott, was Engineer-in-Charge of the Chak-Nizam Bridge as part of the Sind–Sagar Railway that was completed in 1887. The account also adds  Mr Boydell, Executive Engineer and Mr J Spence, Sub-Engineer
Francis Langford O'Callaghan, 1884–85, posted from State Railways as Chief Engineer, Survey of the Sind–Sagar Railway.
Trevredyn Rashleigh Wynne, c.1884, Executive Engineer posted from PWD for 'short stint' to Sind–Sagar Railway.

See also
 History of rail transport in Pakistan
 Scinde, Punjab & Delhi Railway 
 North Western State Railway
 Pakistan Railways

References 
The spelling of Scinde, Punjaub & Delhi Railway is variable. Scinde and Punjaub are the spellings adopted in the legislation - see "Government Statute Law Repeals 2012" pages 134-135, paragraphs 3.78-3.83.

External links
  Fairlawn School was established as Scind, Punjaub and Delhi Railway School, Mussoorie in 1877 
 Thacker's "1872 Scinde, Punjab and Delhi Railway Personnel"

Defunct railway companies of Pakistan